Victory Lap is the only studio album by American rapper Nipsey Hussle . It was released on February 16, 2018 through All Money In No Money Out and Atlantic Records. It was Nipsey Hussle's first major commercial release after releasing a string of mixtapes for thirteen years. The album debuted at number four on the Billboard 200, selling 53,000 album-equivalent units; It was the last project to be released during Nipsey Hussle’s lifetime, as he was shot and killed on March 31, 2019. It reached a new peak of number two in April 2019, following Hussle's death. It received a nomination for Best Rap Album at the 61st Grammy Awards.

Critical reception

Victory Lap received widespread critical acclaim  upon release. Ian McQuaid of The Guardian commented that Nipsey Hussle "effortlessly claims his place as crown prince of G-funk’s new school", adding that "his brags rasp as hoarse and righteous as a man in the middle of a three-day bender, riding beats built from oozing bass swagger and slinking Compton synths, as brash and gleeful as peak-era NWA. It’s visceral west coast rap at its unapologetic finest, as Hussle refreshes cliches of unstoppable prowess with the conviction of a true believer." However he also judged that "At least half the album feels like padding."

Sheldon Pearce of Pitchfork labelled Victory Lap as "the most gripping record in his catalog", also adding: "The hour-long album honors all the work he’s put in and looks back at all he’s achieved, but it also looks forward to all he has yet to build and all those he can still inspire. His tactics can be tone-deaf and without nuance, but he knows exactly who he’s speaking to and for."

Trent Clark of HipHopDX concluded: "Minor potholes aside, Victory Lap not only boosts Nipsey’s stock but it raises expectations for the next time he eyes a checkered flag. The benchmark for quality has been set and the race to officially hit the championship podium is only getting revved up." Online publication HotNewHipHop stated that Victory Lap "toes the line between classic and contemporary hip-hop. It captures the emotion of now, this victorious moment for Hussle, while still pushing for the permanence of a hip-hop classic. It's hard to tell whether Victory Lap offers a transient infectious feeling or life-long addiction, but this album should age well. The production is masterful, the features are well-placed, and Nipsey raps like he just won a marathon. The race for the victory paid off."

Commercial performance
Victory Lap debuted at number four on the US Billboard 200 chart, earning 53,000 album-equivalent units, with 30,000 in traditional album sales in its first week of release. This is Hussle's first top 10 album on the chart. The album also debuted at number three on the US Top R&B/Hip-Hop Albums chart. Following Hussle's death on March 31, 2019, the album reached a new peak of number two on the US Billboard 200, earning 66,000 album-equivalent units (with 17,000 in traditional album sales) in April 2019, behind Billie Eilish's When We All Fall Asleep, Where Do We Go?. Three album tracks, "Double Up", "Last Time That I Checc'd" and "Dedication" also debuted on the US Billboard Hot 100 for the week dated April 13, 2019. On February 16, 2023, the album was certified double platinum by the Recording Industry Association of America (RIAA) for combined sales and album-equivalent units of over two million units in the United States.

Track listing

Notes
 "Succa Proof" originally didn't feature credited vocals by Konshens and J-Black.
 "Victory Lap", "Hussle & Motivate", and "Real Big" features additional vocals by Lauren London.
 "Dedication" features additional vocals by Alexandria Dopson and Garren Edwards.
 "Hussle & Motivate" features additional vocals by David Wade.
 "Million While You Young" features additional vocals by Brian Morgan.
 "Real Big" features background vocals by Alexandria Dopson and Rebekah Muhammad.
 "Double Up" features additional vocals by Axl Folie.
 "Double Up" and "Right Hand 2 God" features additional vocals by Zacari.

Samples
 "Victory Lap" contains an interpolation from "Knee Socks", written by Alex Turner, and performed by Arctic Monkeys.
 "Last Time That I Checc'd" contains an interpolation from "Money, Power & Respect", written by Jason Phillips, Sean Jacobs, David Styles, Earl Simmons, Herb Smith, Deric Angelettie, and Ron Lawrence, and performed by The Lox.
 "Young Nigga" contains a sample from "West District", written by Jahron Brathwaite and Noah "40" Shebib, and performed by PartyNextDoor, which itself samples "Only When Ur Lonely", written by Elgin Lumpkin, Timothy Mosley, Robert Reives and Clarence Lewis, and performed by Ginuwine; and elements from "(Don't Worry) If There's a Hell Below, We're All Going to Go", written and performed by Curtis Mayfield.
 "Blue Laces 2" contains a sample from "Give Me Some of That Good Old Love", written and performed by Willie Hutch.
 "Hussle & Motivate" contains a sample from "Hard Knock Life (Ghetto Anthem)", written by Shawn Carter, Charles Strouse, and Martin Charnin, and performed by Jay-Z.
 "Million While You Young" contains excerpts from A Little Bit of Business (Part 1) (2012), performed by Kyle Donovan and Don Peebles, courtesy of NV Magazine and New York Life Insurance Company.
 "Right Hand 2 God" contains a sample from "Getting Over You", written by David Camon, and performed by The Controllers.

Personnel
Credits adapted from AllMusic.

Performers

 Nipsey Hussle – primary artist
 Alexandria Dopson – background vocals
 Brian Morgan – vocals
 David Wade – vocals
 Garren Edwards – vocals
 J-Black – vocals
 Lauren London – vocals
 Rebekah Muhammad – background vocals
 TeeFLii – featured artist
 Cee-Lo Green – featured artist
 Kendrick Lamar – featured artist
 Konshens – featured artist
 Puff Daddy – featured artist
 Stacy Barthe – featured artist
 YG – featured artist

Technical

 Andrew Grossman – mixing assistant
 Dave Kutch – mastering
 Derek Ali – mixing
 Cyrus "NOIS" Taghipour - mixing
 Ethan Stevens – engineer
 Garnett Flynn – engineer, scratching
 Jeremy Brown – engineer
 Mario "Wizzo" Fernandez – engineer
 Matt Jacobson – mixing advisor, mixing assistant
 Matt Schaeffer – engineer
 Matty Rich – engineer
 Ralo Stylez – engineer
 Rich Keller – mixing
 Roger Butler – engineer, programming
 Tarik Johnston – engineer
 Zachary Acosta – mixing assistant

Musicians
 Brody Brown – keyboards
 Dave Forman – guitar
 DJ Battlecat – talkbox
 Doc Allison – cello, strings
 Eric Choice – keyboards
 Mike & Keys – bass arrangement
 Rance – keyboards
 Uncle Chucc – guitar

Production

 Amaire Johnson – production
 Axelfolie – production
 Brody Brown – additional production
 D.O. Speaks – production
 DJ Khalil – production
 G Koop – production
 Jake One – production
 Kacey Khalil – additional production
 Rance – production
 Mike & Keys – production, additional production
 Mr. Lee – production
 Murda Beatz – production
 Mars – production, additional production
 Nipsey Hussle – production
 Ralo Stylez – production
 Rance – production, additional production
 Sap – production
 Street Symphony – production
 Travis Walton – production

Additional personnel

 Ermias "Nipsey Hussle" Asghedom – executive producer, composer
 Jimmy Fontaine – photography
 Jorge Peniche – creative director, photography
 Natalie Apadula – project manager
 Samiel "Blacc Sam" Asghedom – executive producer
 Stephen "Fatts" Donelson – executive producer
 Steven "Steve-O" Carless – executive producer
 Sean "Diddy" Combs – executive producer
 Virgilio Tzaj – art direction, design

Charts

Weekly charts

Year-end charts

Certifications

References

2018 debut albums
Atlantic Records albums
Albums produced by Jake One
Albums produced by DJ Khalil
Albums produced by Murda Beatz
Albums produced by Sap (producer)
Albums produced by Street Symphony
Nipsey Hussle albums